The 2003 Big League World Series took place from August 2–9 in Easley, South Carolina, United States. Host Easley, South Carolina defeated Thousand Oaks, California in the championship game.

Teams

Results

Group A

Group B

Elimination Round

References

Big League World Series
Big League World Series
Big League World